Krasny Sulin is a town and the administrative center of Krasnosulinsky District in Rostov Oblast, Russia, located in the Donets Basin region. Population:

Administrative and municipal status

Within the framework of administrative divisions, Krasny Sulin serves as the administrative center of Krasnosulinsky District. As an administrative division, it is incorporated within Krasnosulinsky District as Krasnosulinskoye Urban Settlement. As a municipal division, this administrative unit also has urban settlement status and is a part of Krasnosulinsky Municipal District.

References

Notes

Sources

Cities and towns in Rostov Oblast
